Title XX of the New Hampshire Revised Statutes Annotated are the state of New Hampshire's laws in regard to transportation. Title XX spans from RSA 228 to 240.

Chapter 236 Highway Regulation, Control and Protection
Chapter 236 consists of 129 subchapters, making it one of the longest RSAs in the NH Statutes. It contains every single law in regard to highways and associated issues in the state.

Chapter 236:40 Historic Markers
With a petition of 20 citizens, 10 signs per year stating some historical significance can be put up throughout the state on Class I, II and III highways. Markers on Class IV and V highways are discussed in RSA 236:44

Chapter 236:44 Cooperative Markers
Historic Markers located along Class IV or V highways can be jointly built and maintained by the state historical preservation office and the communities in which their located, although expenses must be shared.
https://www.nh.gov/dot/org/projectdevelopment/planning/gis-data-catalog/documents/RSA229-2018.pdf

See also
New Hampshire historical markers
New Hampshire Department of Transportation

References

New Hampshire statutes